The Identity Matrix is a science fiction novel by American writer Jack L. Chalker, published in 1982 by Timescape Books. The work focuses on the body swap and enemy mine plot devices, as well as a background conflict between two powerful alien races.

References

Fiction about body swapping
1982 American novels
1982 science fiction novels
Novels by Jack L. Chalker